Folashade Noimat Okoya (born 25 April 1977) is a Nigerian fashion commentator and the MD/CEO of Eleganza Group, a leading conglomerate in the manufacturing industry in Nigeria founded by her husband, the billionaire industrialist and Aare of Lagos, Chief Razaq Okoya.

Early life and education
Folashade was born on 25 April 1977 to the family of Alhaji Taju and Alhaja Nimosat Adeleye in Lagos State. She is a Muslim and hails from Ijebu Ode, Ogun State. Folashade is an alumnus of Lagos State Polytechnic, where she obtained her National Diploma certificate in Banking and Finance before obtaining a Bachelor of Science degree in Sociology from the University of Lagos.

Personal life
Folashade married Razaq Okoya at the age of 21, at the time when her husband was 59 years old. The couple resides in Lagos, Nigeria with their four children, Olamide, Subomi, Oyinlola and Wahab.

Charities and philanthropic interests
Folashade is the sponsor of the Folashade Okoya Kids Cup, which held its maiden edition in December 2014 in partnership with the Lagos State Grassroots Soccer Association to celebrate kids at Christmas.

Awards and recognition
On 23 August 2014, the European American University awarded Folashade an Honorary Doctorate degree in Business Management and Corporate Leadership. On 11 December 2014, Folashade was awarded the Business Executive of the Year 2014 by the International Centre for Corporate Leadership for African and Blacks in Diaspora. She also won the Inspiring Executive Woman of the Year Award in July, 2018.

References

External links
 Official website

1977 births
Living people
Businesspeople from Lagos
21st-century Nigerian businesswomen
21st-century Nigerian businesspeople
Nigerian fashion businesspeople
Nigerian billionaires
Nigerian philanthropists
Founders of charities